Langley Football Club is a football club based in Slough, Berkshire, England.

History
Upon their formation in 2010, Langley was placed into the East Berkshire Football League. Ahead of the 2018–19 season, Langley joined the Hellenic League Division Two East, finishing second and gaining promotion to the Division One East after winning 24 games from a possible 28. Langley entered the FA Vase for the first time in 2019–20. At the end of the 2020–21 season they were transferred to Division One of the Combined Counties League.

In 2022, a takeover of Langley was completed by InGame Creative; consisting of Darryl Saunders, Nick Gibson and Damian Mallinson, joined by Chris Smith.

Ground
In 2018, Langley entered a ground-sharing agreement with Holyport at Summerleaze Village in Maidenhead, having previously played at Kedermister Park in the Langley area of Slough. In June 2020, Langley announced they were moving back to Slough, ground-sharing Slough Town's Arbour Park.

Records
Best FA Vase performance: First qualifying round, 2019–20

References

External links
Langley FC Official Website

Association football clubs established in 2010
2010 establishments in England
Football clubs in England
Football clubs in Berkshire
Sport in Slough
East Berkshire Football League
Hellenic Football League
Combined Counties Football League